Thomas Clausen (16 January 1801, Snogbæk, Sottrup Municipality, Duchy of Schleswig (now Denmark) – 23 May 1885, Dorpat, Imperial Russia (now Estonia)) was a Danish mathematician and astronomer.

Clausen learned mathematics at home. In 1820, he became a trainee at the Munich Optical Institute and in 1824, at the Altona Observatory after he showed Heinrich Christian Schumacher his paper on calculating longitude by the occultation of stars by the moon.   He eventually returned to Munich, where he conceived and published his best known works on mathematics. In 1842 Clausen was hired by the staff of the Tartu Observatory, becoming its director in 1866-1872.

Works by Clausen include studies on the stability of Solar System, comet movement, ABC telegraph code and calculation of 250 decimals of pi (later, only 248 were confirmed to be correct). In 1840 he discovered the Von Staudt–Clausen theorem. Also in 1840 he also found two compass and straightedge constructions of lunes with equal area to a square, adding to three (including the lune of Hippocrates) known to the ancient Greek mathematician Hippocrates of Chios; it was later shown that these five lunes are the only possible solutions to this problem. In 1854 he factored the sixth Fermat number as 264+1 = 67280421310721 × 274177.

See also 
Clausen's formula
Clausen function

Notes

References 

 

1801 births
1885 deaths
19th-century Danish mathematicians
19th-century Danish astronomers